Alexander Johnston Cassatt (December 8, 1839 – December 28, 1906) was the seventh president of the Pennsylvania Railroad (PRR), serving from June 9, 1899, to December 28, 1906.

Family and early life
Alexander Cassatt was born on December 8, 1839, in Pittsburgh, Pennsylvania, the eldest of seven children born to Robert Simpson Cassat (later Cassatt), and his wife Katherine Cassatt, the former Katherine Kelso Johnston.
The elder Cassatt was a successful stockbroker and land speculator. He was descended from the French Huguenot Jacques Cossart, who came to New Amsterdam in 1662.  Alexander's younger sister was the impressionist painter Mary Cassatt.

His mother Katherine came from a banking family. She was educated and very well read. It was said that of the seven children Alexander most resembled his mother in "appearance and temperament."

In 1856 he entered Rensselaer Polytechnic Institute to study Civil Engineering where his senior thesis was entitled "Review of Pressure Turbine." After graduating in the summer of 1859, Robert Cassatt took Alexander to see a former neighbor from Lancaster Pennsylvania, James Buchanan, 15th President of the United States.

By the fall of 1860, Alexander had secured a position as a surveyor or rodman by the Georgia Railroad. By the time the State of Georgia voted to secede from the Union in January 1861, Cassatt had abandoned his work as surveyor on the Dalton-Knoxville line of the Georgia Railroad and returned to Pennsylvania without seeing any military service during the Civil War.

Career

Pennsylvania Railroad
Frequently referred to as A. J. Cassatt, the great accomplishment under his stewardship was the planning and construction of tunnels under the Hudson River to finally bring PRR's trunk line into New York City. His purchase of a controlling interest in the Long Island Rail Road and the construction of tunnels under the East River created a PRR commuter network on Long Island. Unfortunately, Cassatt died before his grand Pennsylvania Station in New York City was completed.

Cassatt joined the PRR in 1861 as an engineer and rapidly rose through the ranks. He was a vice president in 1877 when the Pittsburgh Railway Riots broke out in 1877, and had become Pennsy First Vice-President by 1880. He was disappointed to be passed over for the presidency and resigned from the company in 1882.

During his absence he devoted his time to horse raising but still was able to organize a new railroad the New York, Philadelphia and Norfolk Railroad (NYP&N), that connected southern markets with the north. Despite no longer being an executive with PRR, he was elected to the PRR's board of directors and was recalled in 1899 to serve as president.
 
Cassatt more than doubled the PRR's total assets during his term, from $276 million to $594 million, while Track and equipment investment increased by almost 150 percent.  The route from New York through Philadelphia, Harrisburg and Altoona to Pittsburgh was made double-tracked throughout; to Washington, D.C., four-tracked—Pennsy's "Broad Way."  Many other lines were double-tracked; almost every part of the system was improved.  New freight cutoffs avoided stations; grade crossings were eliminated, flyovers were built to streamline common paths through junctions, terminals were redesigned, and much more.  Cassatt initiated the Pennsy's program of electrification which led to the road being the United States' most electrified system.

Cassatt was succeeded as Pennsylvania Railroad president by James McCrea.

Civil engineer
In the Spring of 1861, Cassatt had been hired as part of the Engineer Corps of the Pennsylvania Railroad, again as a rodman where he worked on the Connecting Railway.

It is unknown how Cassatt managed to avoid the Pennsylvania militia draft during the Union mobilization in this period but in 1864, Cassatt was transferred to Renovo, Pennsylvania, as a resident engineer to work on the middle division of the Philadelphia and Erie railroad. In 1866, Cassatt became superintendent of motive power and machinery for the Oil Creek and Allegheny River Railway, recently reorganized in 1864 as the Warren and Franklin Railroad which was growing rapidly due to the discovery of oil in the region and coal mining.

In 1867, Cassatt was appointed as superintendent of motive power and machinery for the Pennsylvania railroad in Altoona with a salary of $3,000 per year ($=) when a trainman made less than $10 a week ($=).

Sometime during Cassatt's tenure as superintendent, he married Lois Buchanan, daughter of the Rev. Edward Y. Buchanan and Ann Eliza Foster. Lois Buchanan was a niece of James Buchanan, 15th President of the United States, and through her mother, a niece of songwriter Stephen Foster. The couple had two sons and two daughters.

In 1872, Cassatt was elected as a member to the American Philosophical Society.

Chesterbrook Farm

Cassatt was a horse enthusiast and fox hunter who owned Chesterbrook Farm, outside Berwyn, Pennsylvania, where he bred Thoroughbred racehorses. The  property is today the site of a subdivision with office buildings and homes using the Chesterbrook Farm name. The original main barn designed by Philadelphia architect Frank Furness has been maintained and restored. (Furness also designed Cassatt's Rittenhouse Square townhouse.)

Cassatt initially raced under the pseudonym, Mr. Kelso, and his horses as from the Kelso Stable. He owned the 1886 Preakness Stakes winner, The Bard, and the 1889 Belmont Stakes 1889 winner, Eric. As well, he bred the winner of the 1875, 1876, 1878, and 1880 Preakness Stakes and Foxford, who won the 1891 Belmont.

In addition to flat-racing his Thoroughbreds, in 1895 Cassatt helped found the National Steeplechase Association to organize competitive steeplechase racing. He was also responsible for the introduction of the Hackney pony to the United States. In 1878 he acquired 239 Stella in Britain and brought her to Philadelphia. In 1891, Cassatt and several fellow Hackney enthusiasts founded the American Hackney Horse Society. The organization and registry continues to this day, with its headquarters now in Lexington, Kentucky.

Death
Cassatt died in 1906 at his Rittenhouse Square townhouse in Philadelphia, after a six-month illness. He was interred in the Church of the Redeemer Cemetery in Bryn Mawr, Pennsylvania. His widow died in 1920.

Legacy 

Gramercy Mansion in Baltimore, Maryland, was built by Alexander Cassatt in 1902.

In 1910, the Pennsylvania Railroad erected a statue of Cassatt, by Adolph Alexander Weinman, in a niche at New York City's new Pennsylvania Station. An inscription below the niche read:

The statue is currently located at the Railroad Museum of Pennsylvania in Strasburg, Pennsylvania.

See also
 Pennsylvania Station – Original station, demolished in 1963
 List of railroad executives

References

Further reading

 
 
 Jacobs, Timothy.
 Jonnes, Jill. Conquering Gotham: a Gilded Age epic: the construction of Penn Station and its tunnels; Penguin Books 2007; .
 
 Rensselaer Polytechnic Institute (2005), RPI: Alumni hall of fame: Alexander J. Cassatt. Retrieved February 22, 2005.
 White, John H., Jr. America's most noteworthy railroaders, Railroad History, Railway and Locomotive Historical Society, Spring 1986, 154, p. 9–15.
 Schmidt, David. "Chesterbrook retells the story of Wayne for the 20th century." Lower Merion Historical Society, Bala Cynwyd, Pennsylvania.
 American Hackney Horse Society .

External links

1839 births
1906 deaths
Businesspeople from Pittsburgh
Businesspeople from Philadelphia
People from Lower Merion Township, Pennsylvania
American civil engineers
20th-century American railroad executives
American racehorse owners and breeders
Owners of Preakness Stakes winners
Pennsylvania Railroad people
Rensselaer Polytechnic Institute alumni
American people in rail transportation
Members of the Philadelphia Club
People associated with the Philadelphia Museum of Art
Engineers from Pennsylvania
19th-century American businesspeople